Ingrid Craigie (born 1953 or 1954) is an Irish actor.

Background
Craigie was born in Cork, Ireland to Church of Ireland parents. She grew up in Finglas, Dublin, where her family owned and ran Merville Dairy. Her father, George, served in the Irish Army. Craigie went to school at Alexandra College before studying English at Trinity College Dublin, graduating with a Bachelor of Arts in 1976. Her lecturers included Brendan Kennelly and David Norris. Craigie now lives in Portobello, Dublin.

Career
After university, Craigie joined the company of the Abbey Theatre where she stayed for five years. Her work there included several premieres of Brian Friel plays. Craigie starred as Grace in the 2006 Gate Theatre production of Faith Healer alongside Ralph Fiennes. She has also starred in productions of The Beauty Queen of Leenane, Richard III, Measure for Measure, The Man Who Came to Dinner, Mrs. Warren's Profession and Sweet Bird of Youth. On Broadway, she has appeared in The Cripple of Inishmaan with Daniel Radcliffe, Wonderful Tennessee, Ariel by Marina Carr and alongside Brendan Gleeson in The Plough and the Stars. In 2022, Craigie toured Ireland and the United Kingdom as The Proprietor in the Frank McGuiness play Dinner with Groucho.

Awards and achievements
In 2006, Craigie was appointed to the board of the Gate Theatre. In 2007, she won The Irish Times Irish Theatre Lifetime Achievement Award.

References

External links 
 

21st-century Irish actresses
20th-century Irish actresses
Living people
Irish television actresses
Actresses from County Dublin
Year of birth uncertain
Year of birth missing (living people)